Club Deportivo Basconia is a Spanish football club based in Basauri, Biscay, in the autonomous community of Basque Country. Founded on 14 March 1913, it currently plays in Tercera División RFEF – Group 4, holding home games at Estadio de López Cortázar, with an 8,500-seat capacity. In 1997, they entered into a partnership with Athletic Bilbao to serve as a feeder club for Bilbao and essentially operate as the club's C team.

History
The club played in the second tier for six seasons (1957–63), but this was before the creation of the regionalised new third division in the 1970s.

In 1997, Basconia became Basque neighbours Athletic Bilbao's feeder club, not being eligible for promotion if the reserves, Bilbao Athletic, playing in the level above, did not attain the same goal. The primary function of the agreement is to aid the development of young players in a challenging environment while remaining in the same group under the close guidance of the parent club; a number of teenagers who spent a season at Basconia became professionals at Athletic Bilbao, eventually playing in La Liga and UEFA competitions. In January 2020 it was confirmed that the partnership, due to expire that summer, had been renewed for another three years to 2023.

Basconia's place in Athletic's club structure means that the squad changes greatly each season. About half of the players move up to play for Bilbao Athletic, or go out on loan to other local clubs playing at Segunda División B level. They are replaced by graduates, usually 17 or 18 years old, from the previous year's Juvenil A team. The squad is normally expanded further with new signings from the regions's youth clubs, most notably Danok Bat and Antiguoko.

Although Athletic Bilbao control the main squad's players and coaching personnel, Basconia retains its own club committee and staff and operates several youth teams as well as amateur side Basconia B who compete in the Preferente de Vizcaya league, two levels below the first team. These other teams play in a separate small stadium in the town, Soloarte. Occasionally the main squad has been supplemented by some of Basconia's 'own' players in emergencies – Mikel Rico was with Basconia B when he appeared in one Tercera División fixture in 2001; he left Biscay for a long career across Spain which eventually brought him back to sign for Athletic in 2013.

In January 2018, with the team struggling to remain in the league, Basconia took the unusual step of recruiting some older, more experienced players including Thaylor Lubanzadio to help them maintain their 23-year divisional status, which was eventually accomplished – they finished 15th, 5 points above the relegation zone.

Season to season
 As a separate club

As a farm team

6 seasons in Segunda División
8 seasons in Segunda División B
55 seasons in Tercera División
1 season in Tercera División RFEF

Current squad

Honours
Tercera División
Winners: 1956–57
Winners (3): 1984–85, 1997–98, 2002–03

Notes

Selected coaches

 Javier Clemente
 Joseba Etxeberria
 José Luis Mendilibar

Notable players

Note: this list contains players who have appeared in at least 50 league games for the first team or have reached international status.

 Yeray Álvarez
 Fernando Amorebieta
 Daniel Aranzubia
 José Argoitia
 Joseba Arriaga
 Kepa Arrizabalaga
 Beñat
 Eneko Bóveda
 Javier Casas
 Iñigo Córdoba
 Koldo Etxeberria
 Borja Ekiza
 Unai Expósito
 Cristian Ganea
 Carlos Gurpegi
 Iago Herrerín
 Gorka Iraizoz
 Andoni Iraola
 José Ángel Iribar
 Ander Iturraspe
 Aymeric Laporte
 Enrique Larrinaga
 Iñigo Lekue
 Fernando Llorente
 Unai López
 Sabin Merino
 Unai Núñez
 Luis Prieto
 Mikel Rico
 Unai Simón
 Markel Susaeta
 Ustaritz
 Óscar Vales
 Asier Villalibre
 Iñaki Williams
 Francisco Yeste

See also
Athletic Bilbao (first team)
Bilbao Athletic (B team)

References

External links
Official website 
Team history at Athletic Bilbao's official website
 La Cantera De Lezama Unofficial website focusing on Athletic's cantera teams

Athletic Bilbao
Spanish reserve football teams
Football clubs in the Basque Country (autonomous community)
Association football clubs established in 1913
1913 establishments in Spain
Basconia
Segunda División clubs
CD Basconia